Dominique Youfeigane (born 7 February 2000) is a French professional footballer who plays as a goalkeeper for Ligue 2 club En Avant Guingamp.

Club career
Youfeigane is a youth academy graduate of Guingamp. He made his senior debut for the club on 13 November 2021 in 8–0 cup win against sixth division side US Liffré. He made his professional debut a week later on 20 November in a 2–0 league defeat against Pau.

International career
Born in France, Youfeigane is of Central African Republic descent. He is a former French youth national team player. He has appeared in friendlies for under-18 and under-19 national teams.

Career statistics

Club

References

External links
 
 

2000 births
Living people
Association football goalkeepers
French footballers
France youth international footballers
French sportspeople of Central African Republic descent
Ligue 2 players
Championnat National 2 players
Championnat National 3 players
En Avant Guingamp players